Archduke Leopold Joseph of Austria (June 2, 1682 – August 3, 1684) was a son of Emperor Leopold I and Archduke of Austria. He died in infancy.

References

1682 births
1684 deaths
Heirs apparent who never acceded
17th-century House of Habsburg
Austrian princes
Burials at the Imperial Crypt
Sons of emperors
Children of Leopold I, Holy Roman Emperor
Royalty and nobility who died as children
Sons of kings